The 2023 Lombard regional election took place on 12 and 13 February 2023. The election took place concurrently with the 2023 Lazio regional election, as decided by the Italian government on 9 December 2022.

According to the final results, Attilio Fontana was reelected President of Lombardy with more than 54% of the votes, obtaining the greater bonus given by the electoral law. Voter turnout was registered at 41.61%, the lowest ever recorded for a regional election.

Electoral system 
Since 2012, Lombardy adopted its own legislation to elect its regional council, which is similar to the national Tatarella Law of 1995. While the president of Lombardy and the leader of the opposition are still elected at-large, 78 councilors are elected by party lists under a form of semi-proportional representation. The winning coalition receives a jackpot of at least 45 seats, which are divided between all majority parties using the D'Hondt method, as it happens between the losing lists. Each party then distributes its seats to its provincial lists, where candidates are selected through open lists. According to the Law 17 February 1968, no. 108, the Regional Council is elected every five years. The election can take place no earlier than the fourth Sunday before the completion of this five years period and no later than 60 days after that date.

Political parties and candidates

Opinion polling

Results

Results by provinces

Results by capital city

Elected councillors

References 

2023 elections in Italy
21st century in Lombardy
Regional elections in Lombardy